This is a list of diplomatic missions in Peru. There are currently 58 embassies in Lima, and many countries maintain consulates in other Peruvian cities (not including honorary consulates).

Diplomatic missions in Lima

Embassies

Other missions or delegations 
 (Delegation)
 (Representative office) 
 (Mission)
 (Economic and Cultural Representative Office of Taipei)

Consulates General / Consulates

Cusco
 Consulate
 Consular Agency

Ilo
 Consulate

Iquitos
 Consulate
 Consulate

Puno
 Consulate

Tacna
 Consulate
 Consulate-General

Tumbes
 Consulate

Accredited embassies
Resident in Brasilia, Brazil

 
 

 
 
 
 
 
 
 

 
  

 

 
 
 

 

 

Resident in Buenos Aires, Argentina

 
 
 
 
 
 

Resident in Caracas, Venezuela

 

Resident in Santiago, Chile

 

 

 
 

Resident in Washington, D.C., United States of America

 

 
 
 

Resident elsewhere

 (Ottawa)
 (Mexico City)
 (Mexico City)
 (Quito)
 (Ottawa) 
 (Havana)
 (Bogota)
 (Berlin)
 (Berlin)
 (New York City)
 (Paris)
 (New York City)
 (New York City)
 (Rome)
 (Singapore)
 (Tallinn)

Former Embassies 
  (closed in 1988) 
  (closed in 1971)
  (closed in 1990)
  (closed in 2017)
  (closed in 1993)
  (closed in 2009)
  (closed in 2021)

See also
 Foreign relations of Peru
 List of diplomatic missions of Peru

References

External links
 Ministry of Foreign Affairs of Peru

 
Diplomatic missions
Peru